The next Basque regional election will be held no later than Sunday, 11 August 2024, to elect the 13th Parliament of the Basque Autonomous Community. All 75 seats in the Parliament will be up for election.

Overview

Electoral system
The Basque Parliament is the devolved, unicameral legislature of the autonomous community of the Basque Country, having legislative power in regional matters as defined by the Spanish Constitution of 1978 and the regional Statute of Autonomy, as well as the ability to vote confidence in or withdraw it from a lehendakari.

Voting for the Parliament is on the basis of universal suffrage, which comprises all nationals over 18 years of age, registered in the Basque Country and in full enjoyment of their political rights. Additionally, Basques abroad are required to apply for voting before being permitted to vote, a system known as "begged" or expat vote. The 75 members of the Basque Parliament are elected using the D'Hondt method and a closed list proportional representation, with an electoral threshold of three percent of valid votes—which includes blank ballots—being applied in each constituency. Seats are allocated to constituencies, corresponding to the provinces of Álava, Biscay and Gipuzkoa, being allocated a fixed number of 25 seats each to provide for an equal representation of the three provinces in parliament as required under the regional statute of autonomy. This means that Álava is allocated the same number of seats as Biscay and Gipuzkoa, despite their populations being, as of 1 July 2020, 330,242, 1,142,323 and 716,925, respectively.

The use of the D'Hondt method may result in a higher effective threshold, depending on the district magnitude.

Election date
The term of the Basque Parliament expires four years after the date of its previous election, unless it is dissolved earlier. The election decree shall be issued no later than the twenty-fifth day prior to the date of expiry of parliament and published on the following day in the Official Gazette of the Basque Country (BOPV), with election day taking place on the fifty-fourth day from publication. The previous election was held on 12 July 2020, which meant that the legislature's term will expire on 12 July 2024. The election decree shall be published in the BOPV no later than 18 June 2024 with the election taking place on the fifty-fourth day from publication, setting the latest possible election date for the Parliament on Sunday, 11 August 2024.

The lehendakari has the prerogative to dissolve the Basque Parliament at any given time and call a snap election, provided that no motion of no confidence is in process. In the event of an investiture process failing to elect a lehendakari within a sixty-day period from the Parliament re-assembly, the Parliament is to be dissolved and a fresh election called.

Parliamentary composition
The table below shows the composition of the parliamentary groups in the Parliament at the present time.

Parties and candidates
The electoral law allows for parties and federations registered in the interior ministry, coalitions and groupings of electors to present lists of candidates. Parties and federations intending to form a coalition ahead of an election are required to inform the relevant Electoral Commission within ten days of the election call, whereas groupings of electors need to secure the signature of at least one percent of the electorate in the constituencies for which they seek election, disallowing electors from signing for more than one list of candidates.

Below is a list of the main parties and electoral alliances which will likely contest the election:

Opinion polls
The table below lists voting intention estimates in reverse chronological order, showing the most recent first and using the dates when the survey fieldwork was done, as opposed to the date of publication. Where the fieldwork dates are unknown, the date of publication is given instead. The highest percentage figure in each polling survey is displayed with its background shaded in the leading party's colour. If a tie ensues, this is applied to the figures with the highest percentages. The "Lead" column on the right shows the percentage-point difference between the parties with the highest percentages in a poll. When available, seat projections determined by the polling organisations are displayed below (or in place of) the percentages in a smaller font; 38 seats are required for an absolute majority in the Basque Parliament.

Notes

References
Opinion poll sources

Other

Basque Country
2020s